Félix de Jesús Fernández Christlieb (born 11 January 1967) is a Mexican former professional footballer who played as a goalkeeper. He was a squad member for the Mexico national team at the 1994 FIFA World Cup.

Retirement
Presently, he plays amateur football in the ADECMAC league in Mexico City in the team Club Deportivo Sahara and is an enthusiast organizer of cultural events linking literature and art with soccer. He currently is a co-host of the Univision sports show República Deportiva. He was honored by FC Atlante that retired his number which was the number 12.

References

 
 
 

1967 births
Living people
Mexican people of German descent
Footballers from Mexico City
Association football goalkeepers
Mexican footballers
Mexico international footballers
1994 FIFA World Cup players
Atlante F.C. footballers
Club Celaya footballers
Liga MX players